Huberta (initially named Hubert; the sex was discovered after death) was a hippopotamus which travelled for a large distance across South Africa. In November 1928, Huberta left her waterhole in the St. Lucia Estuary in Zululand and over the next three years, travelled  to the Eastern Cape. In that time, Huberta became a minor celebrity in South Africa and attracted crowds wherever she went. She was initially thought to be a male and was nicknamed Hubert by the press. The first report in the press was on 23 November 1928 in the Natal Mercury and reported the appearance of a hippo in Natal. The report was accompanied by the only photograph of Huberta in life.

After this, she headed south to Durban where she visited a beach and a country club. Moving on to the Umgeni River, she became revered by Zulus and Xhosas alike.

Finally, Huberta arrived in East London in March 1931. Despite her having been declared to be protected royal game by the Natal Provincial Council, she was shot by farmers a month later. After a public outcry, the farmers were arrested and fined £25. Huberta's body was recovered and sent to a taxidermist in London. Upon her return to South Africa in 1932, she was greeted by 20,000 people and was displayed at the Amathole Museum (previously known as the Kaffrarian Museum) in King William's Town.

Huberta is the subject of the children's book Hubert The Traveling Hippopotamus by Edmund Lindop and illustrated by Jane Carlson. The book was published in 1961 by Little, Brown and Company.

References

External links
Hippo page; more info and pictures
 Amathole Museum
 Wild Coast website
 Zululand website
 Municipality of East London website

1931 animal deaths
Deaths by firearm in South Africa
Individual animals in South Africa
Individual hippopotamuses
Individual wild animals
Qonce
Individual taxidermy exhibits